Hardeggasse  is a station on  of the Vienna U-Bahn. It is located in the Donaustadt District. It opened in 2010.

References

External links 
 

Buildings and structures in Donaustadt
Railway stations opened in 2010
Vienna U-Bahn stations